Ain't Nobody Worryin' is the third studio album by the American singer Anthony Hamilton. It was released on December 13, 2005, by So So Def Recordings and Zomba. It debuted at number 19 on the Billboard 200 and at number four on the Top R&B/Hip-Hop Albums chart, selling 112,000 copies in its first week. It was certified gold by the Recording Industry Association of America (RIAA) on April 4, 2006, and, by March 2006, it had sold 350,000 copies in the United States.

Track listing

Notes
  signifies a co-producer

Charts

Weekly charts

Year-end charts

Certifications

Release history

Notes

References

External links
 Substance and Style – by The Washington Post
 Album Review – by the Winnipeg Sun

2005 albums
Albums produced by Dre & Vidal
Albums produced by James Poyser
Albums produced by Mark Batson
Albums produced by Questlove
Albums produced by Raphael Saadiq
Albums recorded at Westlake Recording Studios
Anthony Hamilton (musician) albums
So So Def Recordings albums
Zomba Group of Companies albums